Napa leather (often called Nappa leather) is a leather noted for its soft feel, derived as it is from calves, lambs, and kid goats, which have soft hides. It is a generic term in the leather field and has no distinct test for characterization. Among other uses, napa leather is often used in leather products such as furniture, clothing, handbags, car seats, and shoes.

The leather takes its name from Napa, California, where the process of making napa leather was created by Emanuel Manasse, a German tanner working for The Sawyer Tanning Company.

Notes

References
 B Ellis (1921), Gloves & Glove Trade, page 58,

Leather